José Miguel Salomon Cortés (born 11 March 1972), known as José Salomon Cortés, is a Chilean-Swedish football manager, currently in charge of Sierra Leonean club Bo Rangers.

Early life
Salomon Cortés was born in Valparaíso, Chile, and lived in Viña del Mar, the neighboring commune. He moved to Germany at the age of two before made his home in Sweden.

Career
As a football manager, Salomon Cortés gets a UEFA licence. 

He has worked for both Aston Villa and Chelsea as a scouting agent in recruitment of youth players from Africa and Scandinavia, taking part of the development of footballers such as Nathan Aké, Callum Hudson-Odoi, Kurt Zouma and the Chalobah brothers.

In Sweden, he has worked for the youth systems of AIK, Hammarby and Vasalund.

In 2020 he performed as coach of Vasalund and won the 2020 Ettan Norra and got promotion to the Superettan.

He also has personally trained players such as Williot Swedberg and Amadou Diawara.

He spent a year in Guinea coaching at Académie Soar before joining Sierra Leonean club Bo Rangers on 6 September 2021 as head coach, alongside the Guinean goalkeeping coach Allan Sekou Kamata and both Alhaji Foray and Kabineh Kamara as assistants.

He won the 2021–22 season of the Sierra Leone National Premier League and got qualification to the 2022–23 CAF Champions League. He also was honored as the Coach of the Season.

Honours
Vasalund
 Ettan Norra: 2020

Bo Rangers
 Sierra Leone National Premier League: 2021–22

References

External links
 José Salomon Cortés at Ratsit.se 

1972 births
Living people
Sportspeople from Valparaíso
Chilean football managers
Chilean expatriate football managers
Naturalized citizens of Sweden
Swedish football managers
Swedish expatriate football managers
Vasalunds IF managers
Superettan managers
Chilean expatriate sportspeople in Sweden
Chilean expatriate sportspeople in Sierra Leone
Swedish expatriate sportspeople in Sierra Leone
Expatriate football managers in Sierra Leone
Aston Villa F.C. non-playing staff
Chelsea F.C. non-playing staff
Chilean expatriate sportspeople in England
Swedish expatriate sportspeople in England